Sainte-Cécile-de-Whitton is a municipality in Quebec, in the regional county municipality of Le Granit in the administrative region of Estrie. It is named after Saint Cecilia, the patron saint of musicians and Church music.

References

External links

Répertoire des municipalités du Québec
Commission de toponymie du Québec
Affaires municipales et régions – cartes régionales

Municipalities in Quebec
Incorporated places in Estrie
Le Granit Regional County Municipality